Jeffrey Ellis Farnsworth (born October 6, 1975) is a former Major League Baseball pitcher who played for the Detroit Tigers in 2002. He was born in Wichita, Kansas.

Career
He was drafted by the Seattle Mariners in 1996. He remained in the Seattle farm system till 2001. He was claimed in 2002 by the Detroit Tigers through the Rule 5 draft. He spent the entire season with the Tigers, serving as their long reliever. He pitched in 70 innings for Detroit, striking out 28 while inducing 29 walks. He was outrighted after the 2002 season and spent the entire 2003 season at the Double A level. He signed a minor league deal with the Montreal Expos on January 22, 2004. He signed a minor league deal with the Milwaukee Brewers on June 1, 2004. He appeared in 11 games at the AAA level before being released. He'd jump from organizations throughout the rest of his career, last appearing for the Camden Riversharks of the Atlantic League of Professional Baseball in 2012.

External links

, or Retrosheet, or Pelota Binaria (Venezuelan Winter League)

1975 births
Living people
Atlantic City Surf players
Baseball players from Wichita, Kansas
Caffe Danesi Nettuno players
Camden Riversharks players
Cardenales de Lara players
Caribes de Anzoátegui players
Charlotte Knights players
Detroit Tigers players
Erie SeaWolves players
Everett AquaSox players
American expatriate baseball players in Italy
Indianapolis Indians players
Lancaster JetHawks players
Major League Baseball pitchers
Navegantes del Magallanes players
American expatriate baseball players in Venezuela
New Haven Ravens players
Newark Bears players
Northwest Florida State Raiders baseball players
Pastora de los Llanos players
Pawtucket Red Sox players
San Antonio Missions players
Southern Maryland Blue Crabs players
Sugar Land Skeeters players
Tigres de Aragua players
York Revolution players